= Círculo Eborense =

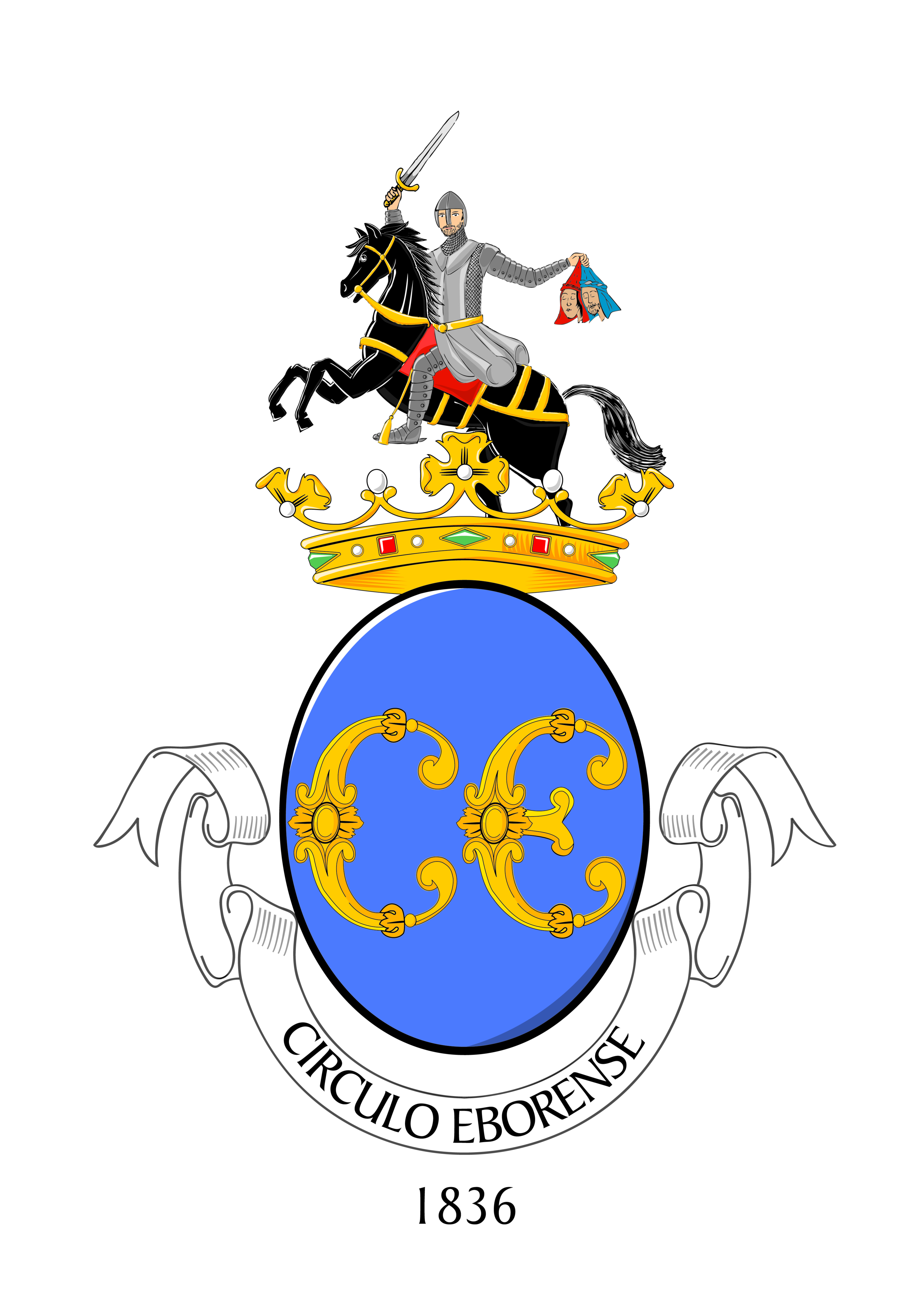
- Clube
- Formation: 3 March 1836
- Headquarters: Évora, Portugal
- Location: Rua Vasco da Gama, n.º 4
- Region served: Évora, Portugal

Círculo Eborense, also known as Clube, is a Portuguese non-profit cultural and recreational association. It is located in the center of Évora, Portugal. It is the first voluntary association of its kind to be created in Évora. It was formally constituted on 9 January 1837, through a royal decree. Supporters had gathered about 36 signatures.

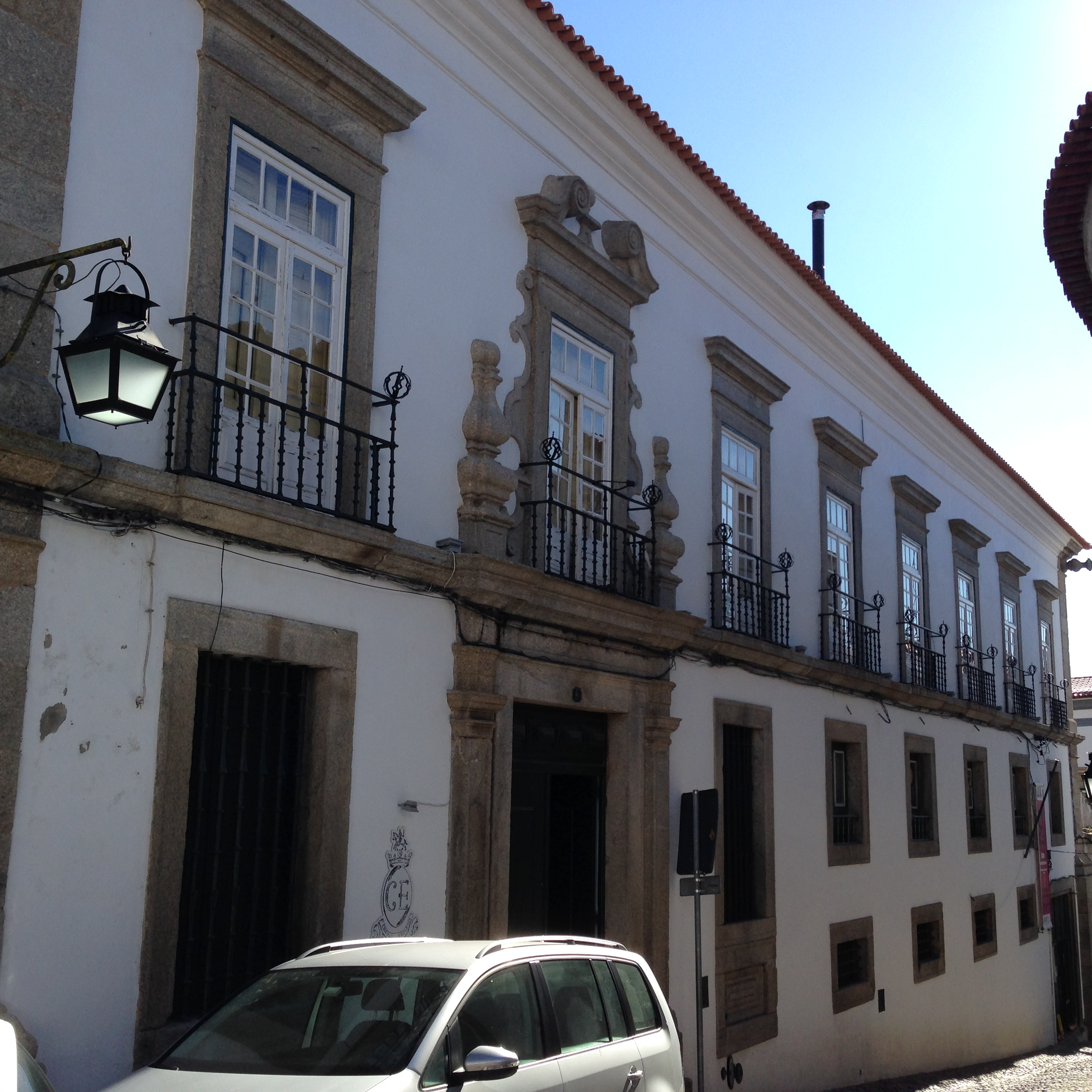
Front facade of the Círculo Eborense

It was formed as part of the burgeoning European club movement. Its goals were to create a space for social gatherings and recreation. Activities included ballroom games, dances, family gatherings, concerts musicals, etc. It served as a model for other congenial clubs.

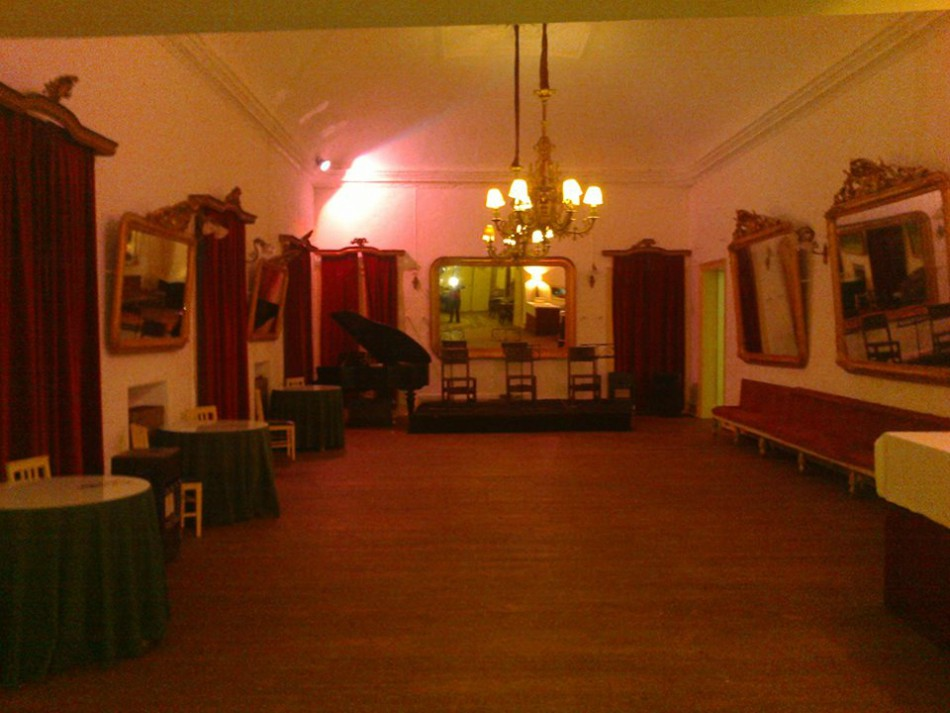
Party room of Círculo Eborense

Membership is dependent on moral and civil requirements and the obligation to pay a jewel and dues, limiting it to the social elites of Évora. Ordinary members lived in Évora and surrounding areas, while extraordinary members were temporary residents in Évora or other municipalities.

Its headquarters is located in a noble house in the old wide of the painted houses, on Vasco da Gama street.

Its organizational structure includes a General Meeting, Board of Directors and Fiscal Council.
